Borgo Panigale (Bolognese dialect: Al Båurg, Båurg Panighèl) was a district of Bologna, northern Italy. Located in the city's western part, between the rivers Lavino and Reno, it had a population  of 24,935 in 2009. Since 2016 it has been part of the Borgo Panigale-Reno district.

Until 1937 it was an autonomous municipality, but was annexed to Bologna under the Fascist government. It is home to motorbike manufacturer Ducati, and Bologna Airport. Other industries in the district include Panigal (soap), Santa Rosa (fruit marmalades), Sabiem (elevators) and Fabbri (sweets).

The name stems from the ancient Latin toponym Vicus Panicalis, and by the fact that later the area was used for cultivation of the foxtail millet cereal, called panìco in Italian.

Elisabetta Sirani painted an altarpiece for the parish church of Borgo Panigale.

Bologna
Former municipalities of Emilia-Romagna
Populated places disestablished in 1937
Neighbourhoods in Italy